17th OTO Awards

SND, Bratislava, Slovakia

Overall winner  Adela Banášová

Hall of Fame Božidara Turzonovová

Plus 7 dní Award Peter Núñez

◄ 16th | 18th ►

The 17th OTO Awards honoring the best in Slovak popular culture for the year 2016, took time and place on March 11, 2017, at the new premises of the Slovak National Theater in Bratislava. The ceremony will broadcast live the channel Jednotka of RTVS. The hosts of the upcoming show will be for the fifth consecutive time, Adela Banášová and Matej Cifra.

Schedule

Nominees

Main categories
 Television

 Music

Others

References

External links
 OTO 2016 – 17th edition (Official website)
 Nominees - Top 3 list (Official website)
 Nominees - Top 7 list  (at Plus 7 dní)

OTO Awards
2016 in Slovak music
2016 in Slovak television
2016 television awards